Stefan Đorđević (born December 4, 1998) is a Serbian professional basketball player for Igokea of the Adriatic League.

Early career 
Đorđević started to play basketball for the youth teams of Crvena zvezda. He played the Euroleague Basketball Next Generation Tournaments for the Crvena zvezda U18 (2015–2017).

Professional career 
On December 28, 2016, Đorđević signed a four-year contract with the Crvena zvezda. Prior to the 2017–18 season, he was loaned to the FMP from Belgrade. He appeared in two ABA League First Division games with FMP. On December 28, 2017, he was loaned to the Vršac for the rest of the 2017–18 season.

In June 2021, Đorđević signed for Bosnian club Igokea.

Personal life 
On June 22, 2020, Đorđević tested positive for COVID-19.

References

External links 
 Profile at eurobasket.com
 Profile at realgm.com

1998 births
Living people
ABA League players
Basketball League of Serbia players
KK Crvena zvezda youth players
KK FMP players
KK Igokea players
KK Vršac players
Serbian expatriate basketball people in Bosnia and Herzegovina
Serbian men's basketball players
Sportspeople from Leskovac
Power forwards (basketball)